The amygdala (plural: amygdalae  or amygdalas; also ; Latin from Greek, 'almond', 'tonsil') is one of two almond-shaped clusters of nuclei located deep and medially within the temporal lobes of the brain's cerebrum in complex vertebrates, including humans. Shown to perform a primary role in the processing of memory, decision making, and emotional responses (including fear, anxiety, and aggression), the amygdalae are considered part of the limbic system. The term "amygdala" was first introduced by Karl Friedrich Burdach in 1822.

Structure 

The regions described as amygdala nuclei encompass several structures of the cerebrum with distinct connectional and functional characteristics in humans and other animals. Among these nuclei are the basolateral complex, the cortical nucleus, the medial nucleus, the central nucleus, and the intercalated cell clusters. The basolateral complex can be further subdivided into the lateral, the basal, and the accessory basal nuclei.

Anatomically, the amygdala  and more particularly its central and medial nuclei, have sometimes been classified as a part of the basal ganglia.

Hemispheric specializations
In one study, electrical stimulations of the right amygdala induced negative emotions, especially fear and sadness. In contrast, stimulation of the left amygdala was able to induce either pleasant (happiness) or unpleasant (fear, anxiety, sadness) emotions. Other evidence suggests that the left amygdala plays a role in the brain's reward system.

Each side holds a specific function in how we perceive and process emotion. The right and left portions of the amygdala have independent memory systems, but work together to store, encode, and interpret emotion.

The right hemisphere of the amygdala is associated with negative emotion. It plays a role in the expression of fear and in the processing of fear-inducing stimuli. Fear conditioning, which occurs when a neutral stimulus acquires aversive properties, occurs within the right hemisphere. When an individual is presented with a conditioned, aversive stimulus, it is processed within the right amygdala, producing an unpleasant or fearful response. This emotional response conditions the individual to avoid fear-inducing stimuli and more importantly, to assess threats in the environment.

The right hemisphere is also linked to declarative memory, which consists of facts and information from previously experienced events and must be consciously recalled. It also plays a significant role in the retention of episodic memory. Episodic memory consists of the autobiographical aspects of memory, permitting recall of emotional and sensory experience of an event. This type of memory does not require conscious recall. The right amygdala plays a role in the association of time and places with emotional properties.

Development and sex distinction

The amygdala is one of the best-understood brain regions with regard to differences between the sexes. The amygdala is larger in males than females in children aged 7 to 11, adult humans, and adult rats.

There is considerable growth within the first few years of structural development in both male and female amygdalae. Within this early period, female limbic structures grow at a more rapid pace than the male ones. Amongst female subjects, the amygdala reaches its full growth potential approximately 1.5 years before the peak of male development. The structural development of the male amygdala occurs over a longer period than in women. Despite the early development of female amygdalae, they reach their growth potential sooner than males, whose amygdalae continue to develop. The larger relative size of the male amygdala may be attributed to this extended developmental period.

Hormonal factors may contribute to these sex-specific developmental differences. The amygdala is rich in androgen receptors – nuclear receptors that bind to testosterone. Androgen receptors play a role in the DNA binding that regulates gene expression. Though testosterone is present within the female hormonal systems, women have lower levels of testosterone than men. The abundance of testosterone in the male hormonal system may contribute to development. In addition, the grey matter volume on the amygdala is predicted by testosterone levels, which may also contribute to the increased mass of the male amygdala.

There are observable developmental differences between the right and left amygdala. The left amygdala reaches its developmental peak approximately 1.5–2 years prior to the right amygdala. Despite the early growth of the left amygdala, the right increases in volume for a longer period of time. The right amygdala is associated with response to fearful stimuli as well as face recognition. It is inferred that the early development of the left amygdala functions to provide infants the ability to detect danger. In childhood, the amygdala is found to react differently to same-sex versus opposite-sex individuals. This reactivity decreases until a person enters adolescence, where it increases dramatically at puberty.

Other functional and structural differences between male and female amygdalae have been observed. Subjects' amygdala activation was observed when watching a horror film and subliminal stimuli. The results of the study showed a different lateralization of the amygdala in men and women. Enhanced memory for the film was related to enhanced activity of the left, but not the right, amygdala in women, whereas it was related to enhanced activity of the right, but not the left, amygdala in men. Similarly, a study of decision-making ability in patients with unilateral amygdala damage suggested that men with right (but not left) amygdala damage were more likely to be impaired in decision-making ability, while women with left (but not right) amygdala damage were more likely to be impaired in decision-making ability. One study found evidence that on average, women tend to retain stronger memories for emotional events than men.

Function

Connections
A simple view of the information processing through the amygdala follows as: the amygdala sends projections to the hypothalamus, the dorsomedial thalamus, the thalamic reticular nucleus, the nuclei of the trigeminal nerve and the facial nerve, the ventral tegmental area, the locus coeruleus, and the laterodorsal tegmental nucleus. The basolateral amygdala projects to the nucleus accumbens, including the medial shell.

The medial nucleus is involved in the sense of smell and pheromone-processing. It receives input from the olfactory bulb and olfactory cortex. The lateral amygdalae, which send impulses to the rest of the basolateral complexes and to the centromedial nuclei, receive input from the sensory systems. The centromedial nuclei are the main outputs for the basolateral complexes, and are involved in emotional arousal in rats and cats.

Variability in amygdala connectivity has been related to a variety of behaviors and outcomes such as fear recognition  and social network size.

Emotional learning

In complex vertebrates, including humans, the amygdalae perform primary roles in the formation and storage of memories associated with emotional events. Research indicates that, during fear conditioning, sensory stimuli reach the basolateral complexes of the amygdalae, particularly the lateral nuclei, where they form associations with memories of the stimuli. The association between stimuli and the aversive events they predict may be mediated by long-term potentiation, a sustained enhancement of signaling between affected neurons. There have been studies that show that damage to the amygdala can interfere with memory that is strengthened by emotion. One study examined a patient with bilateral degeneration of the amygdala. He was told a violent story accompanied by matching pictures and was observed based on how much he could recall from the story. The patient had less recollection of the story than patients with functional amygdala, showing that the amygdala has a strong connection with emotional learning.

Emotional memories are thought to be stored in synapses throughout the brain. Fear memories, for example, are considered to be stored in the neuronal connections from the lateral nuclei to the central nucleus of the amygdalae and the bed nuclei of the stria terminalis (part of the extended amygdala). These connections are not the sole site of fear memories given that the nuclei of the amygdala receive and send information to other brain regions that are important for memory such as the hippocampus. Some sensory neurons project their axon terminals to the central nucleus. The central nuclei are involved in the genesis of many fear responses such as defensive behavior (freezing or escape responses), autonomic nervous system responses (changes in blood pressure and heart rate/tachycardia), neuroendocrine responses (stress-hormone release), etc. Damage to the amygdalae impairs both the acquisition and expression of Pavlovian fear conditioning, a form of classical conditioning of emotional responses. Accumulating evidence has suggested that multiple neuromodulators acting in the amygdala regulates the formation of emotional memories.

The amygdalae are also involved in appetitive (positive) conditioning. It seems that distinct neurons respond to positive and negative stimuli, but there is no clustering of these distinct neurons into clear anatomical nuclei. However, lesions of the central nucleus in the amygdala have been shown to reduce appetitive learning in rats. Lesions of the basolateral regions do not exhibit the same effect. Research like this indicates that different nuclei within the amygdala have different functions in appetitive conditioning.
Nevertheless, researchers found an example of appetitive emotional learning showing an important role for the basolateral amygdala: The naïve female mice are innately attracted to non-volatile pheromones contained in male-soiled bedding, but not by the male-derived volatiles, become attractive if associated with non-volatile attractive pheromones, which act as unconditioned stimulus in a case of Pavlovian associative learning. In the vomeronasal, olfactory and emotional systems, Fos (gene family) proteins show that non-volatile pheromones stimulate the vomeronasal system, whereas air-borne volatiles activate only the olfactory system. Thus, the acquired preference for male-derived volatiles reveals an olfactory-vomeronasal associative learning. Moreover, the reward system is differentially activated by the primary pheromones and secondarily attractive odorants. Exploring the primary attractive pheromone activates the basolateral amygdala and the shell of nucleus accumbens but neither the ventral tegmental area nor the orbitofrontal cortex. In contrast, exploring the secondarily attractive male-derived odorants involves activation of a circuit that includes the basolateral amygdala, prefrontal cortex and ventral tegmental area. Therefore, the basolateral amygdala stands out as the key center for vomeronasal-olfactory associative learning.

Social

Reward
Glutamatergic neurons in the basolateral amygdala send projections to the nucleus accumbens shell and core. Activation of these projections drive motivational salience. The ability of these projections to drive incentive salience is dependent upon dopamine receptor D1.

Memory modulation
The amygdala is also involved in the modulation of memory consolidation. Following any learning event, the long-term memory for the event is not formed instantaneously. Rather, information regarding the event is slowly assimilated into long-term (potentially lifelong) storage over time, possibly via long-term potentiation. Recent studies suggest that the amygdala regulates memory consolidation in other brain regions. Also, fear conditioning, a type of memory that is impaired following amygdala damage, is mediated in part by long-term potentiation.

During the consolidation period, the memory can be modulated. In particular, it appears that emotional arousal following the learning event influences the strength of the subsequent memory for that event. Greater emotional arousal following a learning event enhances a person's retention of that event. Experiments have shown that administration of stress hormones to mice immediately after they learn something enhances their retention when they are tested two days later.

The amygdala, especially the basolateral nuclei, are involved in mediating the effects of emotional arousal on the strength of the memory for the event, as shown by many laboratories including that of James McGaugh. These laboratories have trained animals on a variety of learning tasks and found that drugs injected into the amygdala after training affect the animals' subsequent retention of the task. These tasks include basic classical conditioning tasks such as inhibitory avoidance, where a rat learns to associate a mild footshock with a particular compartment of an apparatus, and more complex tasks such as spatial or cued water maze, where a rat learns to swim to a platform to escape the water. If a drug that activates the amygdalae is injected into the amygdalae, the animals had better memory for the training in the task. If a drug that inactivates the amygdalae is injected, the animals had impaired memory for the task.

In rats, DNA damage was found to increase in the amygdala immediately after exposure to stress. Stress was induced by 30 minutes of restraint or by forced swimming. By seven days after exposure to these stresses, increased DNA damage was no longer detectable in the amygdala, probably because of DNA repair.

Buddhist monks who do compassion meditation have been shown to modulate their amygdala, along with their temporoparietal junction and insula, during their practice. In an fMRI study, more intensive insula activity was found in expert meditators than in novices. 

Amygdala activity at the time of encoding information correlates with retention for that information. However, this correlation depends on the relative "emotionalness" of the information. More emotionally arousing information increases amygdalar activity, and that activity correlates with retention. Amygdala neurons show various types of oscillation during emotional arousal, such as theta activity. These synchronized neuronal events could promote synaptic plasticity (which is involved in memory retention) by increasing interactions between neocortical storage sites and temporal lobe structures involved in declarative memory.

Research using Rorschach test blot 03 finds that the number of unique responses to this random figure links to larger sized amygdalae. The researchers note, "Since previous reports have indicated that unique responses were observed at higher frequency in the artistic population than in the nonartistic normal population, this positive correlation suggests that amygdalar enlargement in the normal population might be related to creative mental activity."

Neuropsychological correlates of amygdala activity
Early research on primates provided explanations as to the functions of the amygdala, as well as a basis for further research. As early as 1888, rhesus monkeys with a lesioned temporal cortex (including the amygdala) were observed to have significant social and emotional deficits. Heinrich Klüver and Paul Bucy later expanded upon this same observation by showing that large lesions to the anterior temporal lobe produced noticeable changes, including overreaction to all objects, hypoemotionality, loss of fear, hypersexuality, and hyperorality, a condition in which inappropriate objects are placed in the mouth. Some monkeys also displayed an inability to recognize familiar objects and would approach animate and inanimate objects indiscriminately, exhibiting a loss of fear towards the experimenters. This behavioral disorder was later named Klüver-Bucy syndrome accordingly, and later research proved it was specifically due to amygdala lesions. Monkey mothers who had amygdala damage showed a reduction in maternal behaviors towards their infants, often physically abusing or neglecting them. In 1981, researchers found that selective radio frequency lesions of the whole amygdala caused Klüver-Bucy syndrome.

With advances in neuroimaging technology such as MRI, neuroscientists have made significant findings concerning the amygdala in the human brain. A variety of data shows the amygdala has a substantial role in mental states, and is related to many psychological disorders. Some studies have shown children with anxiety disorders tend to have a smaller left amygdala. In the majority of the cases, there was an association between an increase in the size of the left amygdala with the use of SSRIs (antidepressant medication) or psychotherapy. The left amygdala has been linked to social anxiety disorder, obsessive and compulsive disorders, and posttraumatic stress disorder, as well as more broadly to separation and generalized anxiety disorder. In a 2003 study, subjects with borderline personality disorder showed significantly greater left amygdala activity than normal control subjects. Some borderline patients even had difficulties classifying neutral faces or saw them as threatening. Individuals with psychopathy show reduced autonomic responses to instructed fear cues than otherwise healthy individuals. In 2006, researchers observed hyperactivity in the amygdala when patients were shown threatening faces or confronted with frightening situations. Patients with severe social phobia showed a correlation with increased response in the amygdala. Similarly, depressed patients showed exaggerated left amygdala activity when interpreting emotions for all faces, and especially for fearful faces. This hyperactivity was normalized when patients were administered antidepressant medication. By contrast, the amygdala has been observed to respond differently in people with bipolar disorder. A 2003 study found that adult and adolescent bipolar patients tended to have considerably smaller amygdala volumes and somewhat smaller hippocampal volumes. Many studies have focused on the connections between the amygdala and autism.

Studies in 2004 and 2006 showed that normal subjects exposed to images of frightened faces or faces of people from another race will show increased activity of the amygdala, even if that exposure is subliminal. However, the amygdala is not necessary for the processing of fear-related stimuli, since persons in whom it is bilaterally damaged show rapid reactions to fearful faces, even in the absence of a functional amygdala.

Sexual orientation
Recent studies have suggested possible correlations between brain structure, including differences in hemispheric ratios and connection patterns in the amygdala, and sexual orientation. Homosexual men tend to exhibit more feminine patterns in the amygdala than heterosexual males do, just as homosexual females tend to show more masculine patterns in the amygdala than heterosexual women do. It was observed that amygdala connections were more widespread from the left amygdala in homosexual males, as is also found in heterosexual females. Amygdala connections were more widespread from the right amygdala in homosexual females, as in heterosexual males.

Social
Increased activity in the amygdala following compassion-oriented meditation may contribute to social connectedness. Similarly, the structural white matter connectivity to other brain regions is also associated with social network size. 

Amygdala volume correlates positively with both the size (the number of contacts a person has) and the complexity (the number of different groups to which a person belongs) of social networks. Individuals with larger amygdalae had larger and more complex social networks. The amygdala is responsible for facial recognition and allows others to respond appropriately to different emotional expressions. They were also better able to make accurate social judgments about other persons' faces. The amygdala's role in the analysis of social situations stems specifically from its ability to identify and process changes in facial features. It does not, however, process the direction of the gaze of the person being perceived.

The amygdala is also thought to be a determinant of the level of a person's emotional intelligence. It is particularly hypothesized that larger amygdalae allow for greater emotional intelligence, enabling greater societal integration and cooperation with others.

The amygdala processes reactions to violations concerning personal space. These reactions are absent in persons in whom the amygdala is damaged bilaterally. Furthermore, the amygdala is found to be activated in fMRI when people observe that others are physically close to them, such as when a person being scanned knows that an experimenter is standing immediately next to the scanner, versus standing at a distance.

Aggression
Animal studies have shown that stimulating the amygdala appears to increase both sexual and aggressive behavior. Likewise, studies using brain lesions have shown that harm to the amygdala may produce the opposite effect. Thus, it appears that this part of the brain may play a role in the display and modulation of aggression.

Fear
There are cases of human patients with focal bilateral amygdala lesions due to the rare genetic condition Urbach-Wiethe disease. Such patients fail to exhibit fear-related behaviors, leading one, S.M., to be dubbed the "woman with no fear". This finding reinforces the conclusion that the amygdala "plays a pivotal role in triggering a state of fear".

Alcoholism and binge drinking
The amygdala appears to play a role in binge drinking, being damaged by repeated episodes of intoxication and withdrawal. Protein kinase C-epsilon in the amygdala is important for regulating behavioral responses to morphine, ethanol, and controlling anxiety-like behavior. The protein is involved in controlling the function of other proteins and plays a role in development of the ability to consume a large amount of ethanol. The duration of chronic alcohol consumption and abstinence may affect dynamic brain network adaptations. When excessive drinking occurs, the amygdala is affected through behavioral changes and reduces the brain's plasticity. Brain plasticity is how our brain grows and develops; it is also how our neurons can make connections with other neurons. This ultimately increases our neural pathways allowing us to increase our knowledge of the world around us. When our brain plasticity decreases, it makes it difficult for neurons to make connections to other neurons. Often when binge drinking, or alcoholism occurs, our amygdala is affected and leads to behavior damage. These behavioral damages can be lack of control, inability to conduct oneself in a mature manner, aggressive behavior, loss of conduct, anxiety, depression, personality disorders, excessive drug intake, bi-polar disorder, confusion, higher tolerance levels, irritability, and inappropriate sexual behaviors with others and self.

Anxiety 
There may also be a link between the amygdala and anxiety. In particular, there is a higher prevalence of females that are affected by anxiety disorders. In an experiment, degu pups were removed from their mother but allowed to hear her call. In response, the males produced increased serotonin receptors in the amygdala but females lost them. This led to the males being less affected by the stressful situation.

The clusters of the amygdala are activated when an individual expresses feelings of fear or aggression. This occurs because the amygdala is the primary structure of the brain responsible for fight or flight response. Anxiety and panic attacks can occur when the amygdala senses environmental stressors that stimulate fight or flight response. The amygdala is directly associated with conditioned fear. Conditioned fear is the framework used to explain the behavior produced when an originally neutral stimulus is consistently paired with a stimulus that evokes fear. The amygdala represents a core fear system in the human body, which is involved in the expression of conditioned fear. Fear is measured by changes in autonomic activity including increased heart rate, increased blood pressure, as well as in simple reflexes such as flinching or blinking.

The central nucleus of the amygdala has direct correlations to the hypothalamus and brainstem – areas directly related to fear and anxiety. This connection is evident from studies of animals that have undergone amygdalae removal. Such studies suggest that animals lacking an amygdala have less fear expression and indulge in non-species-like behavior. Many projection areas of the amygdala are critically involved in specific signs that are used to measure fear and anxiety.

Mammals have very similar ways of processing and responding to danger. Scientists have observed similar areas in the brain – specifically in the amygdala – lighting up or becoming more active when a mammal is threatened or beginning to experience anxiety. Similar parts of the brain are activated when rodents and humans alike observe a dangerous situation, the amygdala playing a crucial role in this assessment. By observing the amygdalae's functions, it can determined why one rodent may be much more anxious than another. There is a direct relationship between the activation of the amygdala and the level of anxiety the subject feels.

Feelings of anxiety start with a catalyst – an environmental stimulus that provokes stress. This can include various smells, sights, and internal sensations that result in anxiety. The amygdala reacts to this stimuli by preparing to either stand and fight or to turn and run. This response is triggered by the release of adrenaline into the bloodstream. Consequently, blood sugar rises, becoming immediately available to the muscles for quick energy. Shaking may occur in an attempt to return blood to the rest of the body. Apart from initiation of stress, long-term changes in amygdala neurons may also increase anxiety after long-term or traumatic stress, led by the action of stress-related hormones within the amygdala. On the flip side, blocking the action of stress hormones in the amygdala reduces anxiety. A better understanding of the amygdala and its various functions may lead to a new way of treating clinical anxiety.

Posttraumatic stress disorder
There seems to be a connection with the amygdalae and how the brain processes posttraumatic stress disorder. Multiple studies have found that the amygdalae may be responsible for the emotional reactions of PTSD patients. One study in particular found that when PTSD patients are shown pictures of faces with fearful expressions, their amygdalae tended to have a higher activation than someone without PTSD.

Bipolar disorder
Amygdala dysfunction during face emotion processing is well-documented in bipolar disorder. Individuals with bipolar disorder showed greater amygdala activity (especially the amygdala/medial-prefrontal-cortex circuit).

Additional images

See also 
 Accessory olfactory cortical areas
 Amygdala hijack
 BELBIC
 Intercalated cells of the amygdala
 List of regions in the human brain
 Triune brain
 Amygdalotomy
 Amygdalohippocampectomy
S.M. (patient)

References

Further reading

External links 

 

 
Neuropsychology